Sophie Thomson is an Australian horticulturalist, author and television and radio personality from Adelaide. 

Thomson is a presenter on ABC's Gardening Australia and an ABC radio talk back host with extensive media experience. 

She writes for major newspapers and magazines and authors books on gardening. Her focus is on the role gardening can play to enhance individual and community wellbeing..

References

Australian television presenters
Australian women television presenters
Year of birth missing (living people)
Living people